Carla Tricoli Rodriguez  is a Puerto Rican model, schoolteacher and actress who was Miss Puerto Rico Universe 2003. 
As a child, Tricoli enjoyed music and she played the cuatro, an instrument that is popular in Puerto Rican music.

As an actress, she has been in a movie named The Losers.

See also
List of Puerto Ricans
Isis Casalduc

References

People from Vieques, Puerto Rico
Miss Puerto Rico
Miss Puerto Rico winners
Puerto Rican female models
Puerto Rican actresses
Puerto Rican educators
University of Puerto Rico alumni
Puerto Rican people of Italian descent
Puerto Rican people of Spanish descent
Living people
Year of birth missing (living people)